William, Billy or Bill Thomson may refer to:

Military
 William Thomson (American soldier) (1727–1796), American militia captain in Capture of Savannah
 William Taylour Thomson (1813–1883), British military officer and diplomat
 William Montgomerie Thomson (1877–1963), British general and commander of the British expeditionary force in north Persia
 William McKenzie Thomson (1898–1987), Canadian World War I pilot

Politics
 William Thompson (Ipswich MP), Solicitor General for England and Wales, 1717–1720
 William Alexander Thomson (1816–1878), Canadian author and politician
 William Thomson (politician) (1818–1866), Member of Parliament in Christchurch, New Zealand
 William Mitchell-Thomson, 1st Baron Selsdon (1877–1938), British politician

Religion
 William Thomson (writer) (1746–1817), Scottish minister and historian 
 William Aird Thomson (1773–1863), Scottish minister and antiquarian
 William McClure Thomson (1806–1894), American missionary and writer
 William Thomson (bishop) (1819–1890), Archbishop of York, 1862–1890
 William Burns Thomson (1821–1893), Scottish medical missionary

Science
 William Thomson (mineralogist) (1760–1806), English physician and geologist
 William Thomson (physician) (1802–1852), Scottish author and professor of medicine
 William Thomson, 1st Baron Kelvin (1824–1907), Scots-Irish physicist
 William Johnston Thomson (1881–1949), Scottish engineer and businessman

Sports
 William Thomson (Dumbarton footballer) (fl. 1892–1898), Scottish footballer (Dumbarton, Scotland)
 William Thomson (Dundee footballer) (1874–1917), Scottish footballer (Dundee, Bolton Wanderers, Scotland)
 William Thomson (rugby union) (1880–1942), Scottish international rugby union player
 Bill Thomson (cricketer) (1943–2019), New Zealand cricketer and hockey player
 Billy Thomson (footballer, born 1895), Scottish football wing half for Bristol Rovers and Leicester City
 Billy Thomson (footballer, born 1958) (1958–2023), Scottish football goalkeeper for Partick Thistle, St Mirren, Dundee United, Clydebank, Motherwell, Rangers and Dundee
 Bill Thomson (ice hockey) (1914–1993), Canadian ice hockey player

Other
 William Thomson (artist) (1926–1988), British artist
 William Thomson (musicologist) (died 1753), Scottish folk song collector and singer
 William John Thomson (1771–1845), American artist
 W. H. Seward Thomson (1856–1932), U.S. federal judge
 William Thomson (mathematician) (1856–1947), Scottish mathematician
 William Thomas Thomson (actuary) (1813–1883), Scottish actuary
 William James Thomson (1857–1927), Canadian artist and engraver
 William Ennis Thomson (born 1927), music school dean
 Bill Thompson (voice actor)

See also 
 William Thompson (disambiguation)